The Dooley ministry (1921) or the first Dooley ministry was the 38th ministry of the New South Wales Government, and was led by the 21st Premier, James Dooley. It was the first of two occasions that Dooley was Premier.

Dooley was elected to the New South Wales Legislative Assembly in 1907, serving until 1927, when he fell out with the Labor leadership, lost Labor preselection, and stood unsuccessfully as an Independent Labor candidate for the Senate in the 1931 federal election. Dooley served as Deputy Labor leader to Ernest Durack and then John Storey, when Labor came to power at the 1920 state election, with what Storey called "half a mandate". The assembly was evenly divided, with Labor having 43 seats and the support of Percy Brookfield and Arthur Gardiner (Independent Labor), while the Nationalists had 28 seats and the support of 15 seats of Progressive Party and 2 independent Nationalists. The Speaker of the Legislative Assembly did not vote unless there was a tie which meant whichever side provided the speaker was unable to command a majority. Nationalist Daniel Levy controversially accepted re-election as speaker, giving Labor an effective majority, Storey died in office on 5 October 1921.

On Storey's death Dooley became Leader and Premier, reconstituting the ministry, which was largely unchanged from the Storey ministry, with the portfolio of Local Government moving from Thomas Mutch to George Cann, the portfolio of Labour and Industry was split into Labour which moved to Greg McGirr and industry becoming State Industrial Enterprises and given to Carlo Lazzarini.

The ministry covers the period from 10 October 1921, five days after Storey's death, until they resigned on 20 December 1921. Levy had resigned as speaker on 12 December 1921, replaced by Labor's Simon Hickey and the government was defeated on the floor of the house 44 votes to 45. Levy was re-elected as speaker, which meant new Premier George Fuller could not command a majority in the house and resigned within seven hours of his appointment. Levy remained as speaker as the only way to have a workable parliament, allowing Dooley to regain power forming the second Dooley ministry.

Composition of ministry
The composition of the ministry was announced by Premier Dooley on 10 October 1921, and covers the period up to 20 December 1921, when the ministry resigned.

 
Ministers are members of the Legislative Assembly unless otherwise noted.

See also

Second Dooley ministry
Members of the New South Wales Legislative Assembly, 1920–1922
Members of the New South Wales Legislative Council, 1920–1922

References

 

New South Wales ministries
1921 establishments in Australia
1921 disestablishments in Australia
Australian Labor Party ministries in New South Wales